HNLMS Van Galen (F803) was a frigate of the . The ship was in service with the Royal Netherlands Navy from 1967 to 1987. The ship's radio call sign was "PAVB". She was sold to the Indonesian Navy where the ship was renamed KRI Yos Sudarso (353).

Design and construction

In the early 1960s, the Royal Netherlands Navy had an urgent requirement to replace its s, obsolete ex-American escorts built during the Second World War. To meet this requirement, it chose to build a modified version of the British  as its , using broadly the same armament as the original design, but where possible, substituting Dutch electronics and radars.

Displacement was  standard and  full load.

A twin 4.5-inch (113 mm) Mark 6 gun mount was fitted forward. Anti-aircraft defence was provided by two quadruple Sea Cat surface-to-air missile launchers on the hangar roof. A Limbo anti-submarine mortar was fitted aft to provide a short-range anti-submarine capability, while a hangar and  helicopter deck allowed a single Westland Wasp helicopter to be operated, for longer range anti-submarine and anti-surface operations.

As built, Van Galen was fitted with a Signaal LW-03 long range air search radar on the ship's mainmast, with a DA02 medium range air/surface surveillance radar carried on the ship's foremast. M44 and M45 fire control radars were provided for the Seacat missiles and ships guns respectively. The ship had a sonar suite of Type 170B attack sonar and Type 162 bottom search sonar. The ship had a crew of 251.

Modifications
All six Van Speijks were modernised in the 1970s, using many of the systems used by the new s. The 4.5-inch gun was replaced by a single OTO Melara 76 mm and launchers for up to eight Harpoon anti-ship missiles fitted (although only two were normally carried). The hangar and flight deck were enlarged, allowing a Westland Lynx helicopter to be carried, while the Limbo mortar was removed, with a pair of triple Mk 32 torpedo launchers providing close-in anti-submarine armament. A Signaal DA03 radar replaced the DA02 radar and an American EDO Corporation CWE-610 sonar replaced the original British sonar. Van Galen was modernised at the Den Helder naval dockyard between 15 July 1977 and 30 November 1979.

Dutch service history
An order for four Van Speijks was placed in 1962, with two more ordered in 1964. HNLMS Van Galen was built at the KM de Schelde in Vlissingen. The keel laying took place on 25 July 1963 and the launching on 19 June 1965. The ship was put into service on 1 March 1967 with the pennant number F803.

The ship received a mid-life modernization in Den Helder, starting on 15 July 1977 and lasting till 30 November 1979.

The four ships then were purchased by Indonesia. Van Galen was decommissioned in 1987 and transferred to the Indonesian Navy on 2 November 1987.

Indonesian service history
On 11 February 1986, Indonesia and the Netherlands signed an agreement for transfer of two Van Speijk class with option on two more ships. The ship was transferred to Indonesia on 2 November 1987 and renamed as KRI Yos Sudarso, assigned with pennant number 353.

Col. Widodo, deputy assistant of the Indonesian Navy's Eastern Fleet, told Radio Republik Indonesia from aboard the Indonesian warship KRI Yos Sudarso that the ferry entered Indonesian waters at 5:28 in the morning of 11 March 1992. At 6:07, Lusitania Expresso had traveled  into Indonesian territory and Captain Luis Dos Santos (Lusitania Expressos captain) was ordered to leave immediately. Col. Widodo said the Portuguese ship's captain obeyed the order and turned his ship around and headed back to sea.

By 2002, the ships Seacat missiles were inoperable and it was reported that propulsion problems were badly effecting the availability of the ships of this class. The ship's Seacat launchers were therefore replaced by two Simbad twin launchers for Mistral anti-aircraft missiles, and Yos Sudarso was re-engined with two  Caterpiller 3616 diesel engines. As the Indonesian Navy retired Harpoon missile from its stockpiles, Yos Sudarso was rearmed with Chinese C-802 missiles.

Notes

References

 

 

Van Speijk-class frigates
1965 ships
Ships built in Vlissingen